Triathlon is among the sports which is being contested at the 2019 South Asian Games. Triathlon is being hosted in the city of Pokhara between December 2 and 4, 2019. The discipline of duathlon was added to the sports program for this edition of the games.

Medal table

Medalists

Triathlon

Duathlon

References

External links
Official website
Triathlon results
Duathlon results

2019 South Asian Games
Events at the 2019 South Asian Games
2019
South Asian Games